Romana Jerković (born 28 November 1964) is a Croatian politician of the Social Democratic Party who has been serving as a Member of the European Parliament for the Croatian nationwide constituency since February 2020.

Political career 
Jerković was a member of the Sabor from 2011 to 2015.

Jerković stood for her party at the 2019 European Parliament election in Croatia failing to win a seat immediately but securing a seat among the British seats that were redistributed after the UK left the European Union. She took her seat in the European Parliament after Brexit. In parliament, she has since been serving on the Committee on Industry, Research and Energy. In addition to her committee assignments, she is part of the parliament's delegation to the EU-Albania Stabilisation and Association Parliamentary Committee and the European Parliament Intergroup on Cancer.

References

External links 
 Biography at the Croatian Parliament website

Living people
1964 births
MEPs for Croatia 2019–2024
Social Democratic Party of Croatia politicians
Social Democratic Party of Croatia MEPs
21st-century Croatian politicians
21st-century Croatian women politicians
Women MEPs for Croatia

University of Rijeka alumni
Representatives in the modern Croatian Parliament